Ben Archibald (born August 26, 1978) is a former gridiron football offensive tackle. He was signed by the San Francisco 49ers as an undrafted free agent in 2003. He played college football at Brigham Young.

Archibald also played for the Amsterdam Admirals, New Orleans Saints and Calgary Stampeders. He won the Grey Cup with the Stamps in 2008 and with BC Lions in 2011.

In 2010, Archibald won the CFL's Most Outstanding Offensive Lineman Award.

External links
Just Sports Stats
BC Lions bio

1978 births
Living people
American football offensive tackles
Amsterdam Admirals players
BC Lions players
BYU Cougars football players
Calgary Stampeders players
Canadian Latter Day Saints
New Orleans Saints players
Players of American football from Tacoma, Washington